Jim C. Smith is an American politician who served as a member of the Indiana Senate from 2010 to 2018. He attended the University of Louisville and was a member of the Clark County Council before being elected to the Indiana Senate. Smith was a sponsor of the bill to eliminate Indiana's estate tax. In 2017, Smith announced that he would not be running for re-election in the 2018 election. He was succeeded by Chris Garten.

References

External links
 Jim Smith at Ballotpedia
Virtual Office of Senator Jim Smith official Indiana State Legislature site
 

Living people
Republican Party Indiana state senators
21st-century American politicians
Year of birth missing (living people)